Joseph Norman Leard (March 23, 1875 – July 20, 1961) was an American football coach and secretary to Green McCurtain, principal chief of the Choctaw Nation of Oklahoma. He was one-thirty-second Choctaw origin and attended in the Indian schools in Oklahoma. He was the head football coach for the Kendall Orange and Black football team from 1895 to 1897.  In addition to being the coach, he was also the captain and quarterback of Kendall's first football team.

Head coaching record

References

1875 births
1961 deaths
American football quarterbacks
Tulsa Golden Hurricane football coaches
Tulsa Golden Hurricane football players
People from Le Flore County, Oklahoma